Parm Gill (born May 17, 1974) is a Canadian politician. He has represented the riding of 
Milton in the Legislative Assembly of Ontario since 2018 and has served as the Ontario Minister for Citizenship and Multiculturalism since June 18, 2021.

As a member of the Conservative Party, he represented the riding of Brampton—Springdale in Ontario in the House of Commons of Canada from 2011 to 2015, holding roles as parliamentary secretary to the Minister of Veterans Affairs and the Minister of International Trade from 2013 until his defeat in the 2015 federal election.

He was elected to the provincial legislature, representing Milton for the Progressive Conservative Party of Ontario, in the 2018 provincial election. In 2021, he was elevated to the Cabinet as the Minister for Citizenship and Multiculturalism, a position unfilled since 2018.

Early life
Gill was born on May 17, 1974, in Moga, Punjab in India.

He moved to Canada at a young age. Before politics, he was an entrepreneur and business executive. He worked on his family's businesses, which include a furniture manufacturing factory and some restaurants that he ran with his older brother.

Political career
According to Gill, he had become involved in federal politics because the thought of Canada legalizing same-sex marriage "pushed him over the edge." In the 2006 federal election, Gill ran in York West, and lost to Liberal MP Judy Sgro by over 15000 votes. In the 2008 federal election, Gill ran in Brampton—Springdale against incumbent Ruby Dhalla, but was narrowly defeated by 773 votes. The election campaign between the two were heated, and during an all-candidates' debate, Dhalla brought up how Gill's brother had been charged with vandalizing her campaign signs in 2006, even though the charges were dropped, and Gill attacked Dhalla for failing to do enough for a boy beaten by police in India after stealing her aide's purse.

He was  elected as a Conservative Party of Canada Member of Parliament representing Brampton Springdale in the 2011 election, defeating Dhalla.

In October 2011, Gill gave a rare mention of the Indian sport of kabaddi in a member's statement supporting the Canadian men's team participating in the upcoming World's Cup in India. Gill and fellow Conservative MP Tim Uppal would later watch the Canadian men upset the Pakistani team in the semifinals.

After witnessing increased gang activity in his riding, Gill toured Western Canadian cities in December 2011 to speak with police and community organizations to see how this could be stopped. In May 2012, Gill introduced a private members bill, C-394, which made it a crime to target someone for recruitment into a gang. It was eventually passed into law in June 2014.

In September 2013, Gill was appointed Parliamentary Secretary to the Minister of Veterans Affairs. During Rob Ford's drug scandal, Gill was one of the few federal politicians to offer support for the embattled mayor, calling him a "great mayor" who was "doing a wonderful job" in November 2013, and claimed that Torontonians were happy with his record.

In January 2015, Gill was appointed by Prime Minister Stephen Harper to the role of a Parliamentary Secretary to the Minister of International Trade. In May 2015, Gill wrote letters of support to the Canadian Radio-television and Telecommunications Commission (CRTC) for two of his constituents' competing applications for a community radio station in Brampton. The Conflict of Interest Act bars parliamentary secretaries from writing such letters to the CRTC and other administrative tribunals, and in October 2013, ethics commissioner Mary Dawson had issued a directive to that effect. The Ethics Commissioner ruled in February 2016 that although he had acted in good faith, Gill had violated the Conflict of Interest Act.

2015 election
Redistribution of federal ridings took place and concluded shortly before the 2015 federal election. Gill's riding, Brampton-Springdale, was eliminated, and he ran in the new riding of Brampton North.

In August 2015, the Huffington Post reported that a supporter of Gill's who previously bundled donations to Liberal MP Jim Karygiannis, had switched his allegiance and had induced Liberal supporters into donating to Gill without their consent. In October 2015, a week and a half before voting day, it was reported that the commissioner of Elections Canada launched an investigation into these claims.

During the election, Gill criticized the provincial Ontario Liberal Party and Premier Kathleen Wynne's proposed updates to the sexual education curriculum, which had not been changed since 1998. The changes included teaching that homosexuality was acceptable in Grade 3, teaching about puberty in Grade 4 as opposed to Grade 5, and teaching about masturbation  and gender expression in Grade 6. Gill described the changes as "graphic and explicit" in a taxpayer-funded mailout which conflated the provincial party's education policies with those of separate federal Liberal party, which has no constitutional jurisdiction in the field. In the mailout, Gill also said that it was part of a Liberal attack on family values and parent's right to control the education of their children. In a 2015 video with the Punjabi Post, Gill described some segments of the new education curriculum as "disgusting."

Gill lost to Liberal candidate Ruby Sahota.

Provincial politics
On October 29, 2016, Gill announced that he would seek the Progressive Conservative Party of Ontario nomination in Milton for the 42nd Ontario general election. On June 18, 2017, he won the nomination. In June 2017, then Progressive Conservative leader Patrick Brown said that Gill's position on gay rights had shifted, and he was now "100 per cent" in favour of gay rights.

On June 7, 2018 Gill won the Ontario general election in the riding of Milton as a member of the Progressive Conservatives.

Personal life
Gill lives in Milton with his wife Amarpal, with whom he has two sons, Daman and Raman, and a daughter, Parmeet.

Electoral record

References

External links

 Official website as of April 25, 2009, on Wayback Machine

Living people
1974 births
21st-century Canadian politicians
Canadian politicians of Indian descent
Canadian Sikhs
Conservative Party of Canada MPs
Members of the House of Commons of Canada from Ontario
Politicians from Brampton
Progressive Conservative Party of Ontario MPPs